The 2012 Los Angeles County Board of Supervisors elections were held on June 5, 2012, coinciding with the Presidential primary elections, June 2012. Three of the five seats (for the Second, Fourth and Fifth Districts) of the Los Angeles County Board of Supervisors were contested in this election. None of the incumbents were termed out.

Results

Second District 
 

The incumbent, Mark Ridley-Thomas, ran unopposed.

Fourth District 
 

The incumbent, Don Knabe, ran unopposed.

Fifth District

References

External links 
Los Angeles County Department of Registrar-Recorder/County Clerk

Los Angeles County Board of Supervisors
Los Angeles County Board of Supervisors elections
Los Angeles County